Eran Wickramaratne, MP is a Sri Lankan banker and politician. He is the former State Minister of Finance and member of Parliament of Sri Lanka. He was the Deputy Minister of Investment Promotions and Highways under 100 days program. He was the former CEO of NDB Bank since 2001 to 2010 and former Chairman of the Information Communication Technology Agency (ICTA).

Education
Educated at Royal College Colombo, where he served as Head Prefect and played at the Royal–Thomian. He gained a BSc in Economics and Politics and an MSc in Economics from the University of London. He is also an Eisenhower Fellow.

Banking career
Having joined Citibank in 1982, he went on to become a Vice President in 1996. In 2000, he was involved in founding NDB Bank, where he became CEO in 2001. In 2005, he served as a Director and advisor for Board of Investment (BoI) and later became an adviser to the Ministry of Science & Economic Reform. During this time he was instrumental in the formation of the first Information Communication Act and became the founder chairman of the Information Communication Technology Agency (ICTA). He resigned from his post of CEO of NDB to take up his seat in Parliament in 2010.

Political career
He joined the right of centre United National Party, serving as its treasurer and entered parliament from the National List at the 2010 General Elections. After the election of Maithripala Sirisena, Wickramaratne was appointed as the Deputy Minister of Investment Promotions and Highways in the "good governance" government under the premiership of Ranil Wickremasinghe.  He was appointed as the United National Party chief organiser of the Colombo-East electorate before being shifted to the Moratuwa electorate in 2015. In the general election that followed he was elected to parliament from the Colombo district gaining 82,737 votes. In 2015, he was appointed Deputy Minister of Investment Promotions and Highways and in 2017 he was appointed State Minister of Finance, holding office until the appointment in 2019 of a new caretaker cabinet headed by Mahinda Rajapaksa.

Family
He is the son of prominent evangelical pastor Rev. Dr. Colton Wickramaratne and of brother Dishan Wickramaratne. He is married to Kushlani Wickramaratne and is a father to two children, Sohanya and Dhishan.

References 

Sri Lankan bankers
Sinhalese businesspeople
Alumni of Royal College, Colombo
Alumni of the University of London
Members of the 14th Parliament of Sri Lanka
Members of the 15th Parliament of Sri Lanka
Members of the 16th Parliament of Sri Lanka
Samagi Jana Balawegaya politicians
Living people
Deputy ministers of Sri Lanka
Sri Lankan Christians
Year of birth missing (living people)